This article provides information on candidates who stood for the 1966 Australian federal election. The election was held on 26 November 1966.

Retiring Members

Labor
 Jock Nelson MP (Northern Territory, NT)
 Bill Riordan MP (Kennedy, Qld)

Liberal
 Frank Davis MP (Deakin, Vic)
 Bill Falkinder MP (Franklin, Tas)
 William Jack MP (North Sydney, NSW)
 Robert Lindsay MP (Flinders, Vic)
 Dan Mackinnon MP (Corangamite, Vic)
 Sir John McLeay MP (Boothby, SA)
 Sir Keith Wilson MP (Sturt, SA)

Country
 Wilfred Brimblecombe MP (Maranoa, Qld)

House of Representatives
Sitting members at the time of the election are shown in bold text. Successful candidates are highlighted in the relevant colour. Where there is possible confusion, an asterisk (*) is also used.

Australian Capital Territory

New South Wales

Northern Territory

Queensland

South Australia

Tasmania

Victoria

Western Australia

Senate
Sitting Senators are shown in bold text. Tickets that elected at least one Senator are highlighted in the relevant colour. Successful candidates are identified by an asterisk (*).

New South Wales
A special election was held in New South Wales to fill the vacancy caused by the resignation of Liberal Senator Sir William Spooner. Bob Cotton, also of the Liberal Party, had been appointed to this vacancy in the interim period.

Queensland
A special election was held in Queensland to fill the vacancy caused by the death of Liberal Senator Bob Sherrington. Bill Heatley, also of the Liberal Party, had been appointed to this vacancy in the interim period.

Victoria
Two special elections were held in Victoria to fill the vacancies caused by the deaths of Labor Senator Charles Sandford and Country Party Senator Harrie Wade. George Poyser, also of the Labor Party, and James Webster, of the Country Party, had been appointed to these vacancies in the interim period.

Western Australia
Two special elections were held in Western Australia to fill the vacancies caused by the deaths of Liberal Senators Sir Shane Paltridge and Seddon Vincent. Peter Sim and Reg Withers, both also of the Liberal Party, had been appointed to these vacancies in the interim period.

Summary by party 

Beside each party is the number of seats contested by that party in the House of Representatives for each state, as well as an indication of whether the party contested special Senate elections in New South Wales, Victoria, Queensland and Western Australia.

See also
 1966 Australian federal election

 1966 Australian Senate election

 Members of the Australian House of Representatives, 1963–1966
 Members of the Australian House of Representatives, 1966–1969
 List of political parties in Australia

References
Adam Carr's Election Archive - House of Representatives 1966
Adam Carr's Election Archive - Senate 1966

1966 elections in Australia
Candidates for Australian federal elections